Neuengörs is a municipality in the district of Segeberg, in Schleswig-Holstein, Germany. It consists of three villages: Neuengörs, Altengörs and Stubben. The village of Neuengörs is the center of the surrounding villages, as it has a church, a primary school and several active clubs and sports societies. The local government consists of two parties, AKW and ABKWG.

References

Municipalities in Schleswig-Holstein
Segeberg